, the indie rock band Guillemots have recorded more than 80 songs for their four studio albums and other official releases. The band was formed in November 2004, with their first official material being I Saw Such Things in My Sleep, an extended play (EP) released in September 2005. The EP contained four songs, including "Made-Up Lovesong #43", a track that would also feature on their first studio album, Through the Windowpane. The release of I Saw Such Things in My Sleep was followed three months later by Guillemots' debut single, "Trains to Brazil". Like "Made-Up Lovesong #43", it was also included on Through the Windowpane, which was released in July 2006. The album's songs were well received by critics: review aggregator Metacritic gave the record a score of 81 out of 100, indicating "universal acclaim". Craig McLean of The Observer described them as "gorgeous tunes that are lithe enough to cope with the little bursts of sonic madness". Two additional tracks were released as singles from the album: "We're Here" and "Annie, Let's Not Wait".

Of the twelve songs on Through the Windowpane, nine were written by lead singer Fyfe Dangerfield. Speaking in 2008, Guillemots member MC Lord Magrão remarked: "For the first album, Fyfe handled most of the songs. ... We worked with him and developed [them]." In October 2006, Guillemots brought out Of the Night, a four-track EP that featured one song written by each member of the band. Eighteen months later, the band released their second album, Red. This album's songs were more pop-orientated than their debut's, and were written by all four members of the group. Magrão explained: "With the second [album], we ended up improvising loads and getting all the new songs from all of the improvised sessions we had." Of the eleven tracks on the record, nine were credited to Guillemots, with the remaining two being credited to Dangerfield alone. Red songs received less critical acclaim than their debut's; Metacritic awarded the album a score of 60 out of 100, suggesting "mixed or average reviews". Four tracks—"Get Over It", "Falling Out of Reach" and a double A-side of "Kriss Kross" and "Clarion"—were released as singles in the UK.

Guillemots' third album, Walk the River, was released in April 2011. It was the first Guillemots album to feature neither a strings nor brass section – its tracks were described by The Independent as being more "noticeably stripped down" than those of previous releases. Unlike Through the Windowpane and Red, singles from Walk the River were distributed exclusively online, with no accompanying physical release. Reviews were generally favourable, with Metacritic reporting a score of 69 out of 100 for the record. Three singles were taken from the album: "The Basket", "I Must Be a Lover" and "I Don't Feel Amazing Now". On 7 May 2012, the band announced their intention to release four albums during the year, each representing a different season – the first, Hello Land!, was released through Greedbag the same day.

Songs

Released

All songs credited to Guillemots, except where noted.

Unreleased

Since forming in 2004, Guillemots have recorded songs that have not been included on their official releases. At the end of 2005, the band uploaded a demo of their song "Cold Cool Moon" to their official website for fans to download for free. They also uploaded three improvised songs that had been recorded during jam sessions. During a series of live shows in 2006, the group featured in their set lists the Christmas carol "In the Bleak Midwinter" and original songs that had not formed part of Through the Windowpane. One such track, "21st May", was described by The Times as "gleefully [marrying] a hip-shaking reggae beat to jazz sax". In 2011, Guillemots recorded a version of "Tomorrow Never Knows" by John Lennon and Paul McCartney for the BBC's coverage of Glastonbury Festival 2011.

References

External links
Guillemots songs at Allmusic

 
Guillemots